Williams Grove is a historic home located at Berlin, Worcester County, Maryland, United States. It is a two-story, three-part house built in three principal stages. The construction sequence began about 1810 with a two-story, two-bay frame house with a single-story wing, that forms the center of the house.  The house was expanded first during the mid 19th century and in the early 1970s, a two-story kitchen and garage wing was added.  The exterior is covered with cypress shingles.

Williams Grove was listed on the National Register of Historic Places in 1996.

References

External links
, including photo from 1994, at Maryland Historical Trust

Berlin, Maryland
Houses on the National Register of Historic Places in Maryland
Federal architecture in Maryland
Greek Revival architecture in Maryland
Houses in Worcester County, Maryland
National Register of Historic Places in Worcester County, Maryland